Croatia participated in the Eurovision Song Contest 2001 with the song "Strings of My Heart" written by Tonči Huljić, Vjekoslava Huljić and Ante Pecotić. The song was performed by Vanna. The Croatian broadcaster Croatian Radiotelevision (HRT) organised the national final Dora 2001 to select the Croatian entry for the 2001 contest in Copenhagen, Denmark. Twenty entries competed in the national final on 4 March 2001 and "Strune ljubavi" performed by Vanna was selected as the winner following the combination of votes from five regional juries, a six-member expert jury, a regional televote and an online vote. The song was later translated from Croatian to English for the Eurovision Song Contest and was titled "Strings of My Heart".

Croatia competed in the Eurovision Song Contest which took place on 12 May 2001. Performing during the show in position 10, Croatia placed tenth out of the 23 participating countries, scoring 42 points.

Background 

The nation's best result in the contest was fourth, which it achieved on two occasions: in 1996 with the song "Sveta ljubav" performed by Maja Blagdan and in 1999 with the song "Marija Magdalena" performed by Doris Dragović. In 2000, Croatia placed ninth with Goran Karan and the song "Kad zaspu anđeli".

The Croatian national broadcaster, Croatian Radiotelevision (HRT), broadcasts the event within Croatia and organises the selection process for the nation's entry. Between 1993 and 2000, HRT organised the national final Dora in order to select the Croatian entry for the Eurovision Song Contest, a method that continued for their 2001 participation.

Before Eurovision

Dora 2001 
Dora 2001 was the ninth edition of the Croatian national selection Dora which selected Croatia's entry for the Eurovision Song Contest 2001. The competition consisted of twenty entries competing in one final on 4 March 2001 at the Studio 11 of HRT in Zagreb, hosted by Dusko Ćurlić and Bojana Gregorić. The show was broadcast on HTV1 and via radio on HR 2 as well as online via the broadcaster's website hrt.hr.

Competing entries 
On 16 November 2000, HRT opened a submission period where artists and composers were able to submit their entries to the broadcaster with the deadline on 17 December 2000. Artists were required to be signed to record companies in order to participate in the competition. An additional seven composers were also invited by HRT to submit songs following consultation with the Croatian Composers' Society (HDS) and Croatian Musicians Union (HDS): Tonči Huljić, Rajko Dujmić, Miro Buljan, Zrinko Tutić, Nenad Ninčević, Zdenko Runjić and Đorđe Novković. 170 entries were received by the broadcaster during the submission period. A nine-member expert committee consisting of Pero Gotovac, Nikica Kalogjera, Stjepan Mihaljinec, Matija Dedić, Siniša Doronjga, Husein Hasanefendić, Stjepan Fučkar, Aleksandar Kostadinov and Velimir Đuretić reviewed the received submissions and selected twenty artists and songs for the competition. HRT announced the competing entries on 15 January 2001 and among the artists were Tereza Kesovija who represented Monaco in the Eurovision Song Contest 1966 and Yugoslavia in the Eurovision Song Contest 1972, Novi fosili who represented Yugoslavia in the Eurovision Song Contest 1987, Vladimir Kočiš Zec of Novi fosili, Putokazi which represented Croatia in the Eurovision Song Contest 1993 as Put, and Tony Cetinski who represented Croatia in the Eurovision Song Contest 1994. 

Prior to the competition, "Ne bih te mogla voljeti više", written by Enes Tvrtković and to have been performed by Ivana Banfić, was withdrawn due to disagreements with the language of the song to be performed and replaced with "Za tebe stvorena" performed by Vesna Pisarović. On 2 February 2001, Emilija Kokić who won the Eurovision Song Contest 1989 for Yugoslavia as a member of Riva replaced Minea as the co-performer of the song "Ljepota". The running order of the final was determined during a draw on 30 January 2001.

Final 
The final took place on 4 March 2001. Twelve of the twenty competing songs were performed with HRT's Revijski Orchestra with its own conductors and the winner, "Strune ljubavi" performed by Vanna, was determined by a combination of votes from four regional juries, an expert jury, a public televote which was divided into four telephone regions in Croatia and online voting. The writers of the winning song also received a monetary award of 100,000 kuna. In addition to the performances of the competing entries, the Zagreb Dance Ensemble, Bojana Gregorić and 2000 Croatian Eurovision entrant Goran Karan performed as the interval acts during the show.

At Eurovision
The Eurovision Song Contest 2001 took place at Parken Stadium in Copenhagen, Denmark, on 12 May 2001. The relegation rules introduced for the 1997 contest were again utilised ahead of the 2001 contest, based on each country's average points total in previous contests. The 23 participants were made up of the host country, the "Big Four" (France, Germany, Spain and the United Kingdom), and the 12 countries with the highest average scores between the 1996 and 2000 contests competed in the final. On 21 November 2000, a special allocation draw was held which determined the running order and Croatia was set to perform in position 10, following the entry from Latvia and before the entry from Portugal. At the contest, Vanna performed the English version of "Strune ljubavi" entitled "Strings of My Heart" and Croatia finished in tenth place with 42 points.

The show was broadcast in Croatia on HTV1. The Croatian spokesperson, who announced the Croatian votes during the final, was Daniela Trbović.

Voting 
Below is a breakdown of points awarded to Croatia and awarded by Croatia in the contest. The nation awarded its 12 points to Denmark in the contest.

References

External links
Dora 2001 at the Eurofest Croatia website 

2001
Countries in the Eurovision Song Contest 2001
Eurovision